Sarcoprion (from the Ancient Greek for "flesh saw") is an extinct genus of eugeneodontid holocephalids from the Permian of Greenland. Similar to other eugeneodontids such as Edestus and Helicoprion, it was best known for its extremely bizarre tooth morphology compared to other species of sharks and their closest relatives, the chimaeras. Compared to other members of the Helicoprionidae (teeth of Agassiz), its "tooth whorls" were found to be sharper, more compact, and in better condition than other sharks of the time, and refrained from growing to extremely unwieldy forms that would raise questions about its ability to feed properly. The genus contains one species, Sarcoprion edax ("gluttonous flesh saw"), found in Permian-aged marine strata of Meddelelser om Grønland.

Description
Sarcoprion had a jaw and mouth structure which allowed it to be more hydrodynamic, reducing the size and shape of the tooth whorl and increasing the size of the rostrum. Sarcoprion is thought to have pursued smaller, fast-moving prey similar to today's mako shark.

Paleobiology
Using the compact tooth whorl during hunting, Sarcoprion hunted a large variety of species, diving at them with high speed and sawing vulnerable areas. Any creatures that were wedged between its rostrum and its teeth were vertically thrashed to inflict maximum damage.

References

Permian fish of North America
Agassizodontidae
Prehistoric cartilaginous fish genera
Permian cartilaginous fish
Fossil taxa described in 1952